Bucinna is a genus of moths of the family Noctuidae.

Species
Bucinna divisalis (Walker, 1866)
Bucinna obagitalis (Walker, 1859)

References
Natural History Museum Lepidoptera genus database

Calpinae